Semiognatha is a monotypic genus of beetles in the family Buprestidae, tribe Stigmoderini, the jewel beetles. The sole species, Semiognatha sainvali, was described in 2004 from a specimen collected in Brazil.

References

Monotypic Buprestidae genera
Fauna of Brazil
Insects of South America